= TravelBlog.org =

TravelBlog.org is a free online service which allows users to create and share travel-related blogs.

Founded in April 2002, Travelblog.org was the first popular website to use the term "Travel blog".

TravelBlog.org was developed to help people share their real life travel experiences with friends, family and other travelers. Although there have been many additions to the services TravelBlog.org offers, the website retains this principle and remains both free to use and independent. As of October 2007, TravelBlog.org held over 50,000 members and hosted over 200,000 blog entries.

The site allows travelers to notify subscribers whenever an update is made to their blog. The core features of TravelBlog.org are to allow members to share unlimited photos, embed videos, create maps, and participate in forums.

TravelBlog.org has received positive analysis from a number of media outlets including The New York Times, The Washington Post, The Times and The Daily Telegraph. TravelBlog.org has been highlighted by Yahoo and is one of The Times' top 100 travel websites - cited under Travel 2.0.
